Tanoan , also Kiowa–Tanoan or Tanoan–Kiowa, is a family of languages spoken by indigenous peoples in present-day New Mexico, Kansas, Oklahoma, and Texas.

Most of the languages – Tiwa (Taos, Picuris, Southern Tiwa), Tewa, and Towa – are spoken in the Native American Pueblos of New Mexico (with one outlier in Arizona). These were the first languages collectively given the name of Tanoan. Kiowa, which is a related language, is now spoken mostly in southwestern Oklahoma. The Kiowa historically inhabited areas of modern-day Texas and Oklahoma.

Languages

The Tanoan language family has seven languages in four branches: 

Kiowa–Towa might form an intermediate branch, as might Tiwa–Tewa.

Name

Tanoan has long been recognized as a major family of Pueblo languages, consisting of Tiwa, Tewa, and Towa. The inclusion of Kiowa into the family was at first controversial given the cultural differences between those groups. The once-nomadic Kiowa people of the Plains are culturally quite distinct from the Tiwa, Tewa, and Towa pueblos, which obscured somewhat the linguistic connection between Tanoans and Kiowans. Linguists now accept that a Tanoan family without Kiowa would be paraphyletic, as any ancestor of the Pueblo languages would be ancestral to Kiowa as well. Kiowa may be closer to Towa than Towa is to Tiwa–Tewa. In older texts, Tanoan and Kiowa–Tanoan were used interchangeably. Because of the cultural use of the name Tanoan as signifying several peoples who share a culture, the more explicit term Kiowa–Tanoan is now commonly used for the language family as a whole, with Tanoan being the branch that contains the languages now spoken in New Mexico and Arizona (i.e. Arizona Tewa)

The prehistory of the Kiowa people is little known. As a result, the history is obscure about the separation of the members of this language family into two groups ('Puebloan' and 'Plains') with radically distinct lifestyles.    There is apparently no  oral tradition of any ancient connection between the peoples. Scholars have not determined when the peoples were connected so that the common linguistic elements could have developed. The earliest traditions and historical notices of the Kiowa record them migrating from the north and west, to the territory now associated with the tribal nation. Today this area is within the modern states of Texas and Oklahoma, which they occupied from the late 18th century.

Historical phonology

The chart below contains the reconstructed consonants of the Tanoan proto-language as reconstructed by Hale (1967) based on consonant correspondences in stem-initial position.

{| class="wikitable" style="text-align: center;"
|- style="line-height: 1.1em;"
! colspan="2" |
! Labial
! Apical
! ApicalFricated
! Velar
! VelarLabial
! Glottal
|-
! rowspan="4" | Plosive
! voiced
|  ||  ||  ||  ||  ||
|-
! plain
|  ||  ||  ||  ||  ||
|-
! glottalized
|  ||  ||  ||  ||  || 
|-
! aspirated
|  ||  ||  ||  ||  ||
|-
! colspan="2" | Nasal
|  ||  || || || ||
|-
! colspan="2" | Fricative
| || ||  || || || 
|-
! colspan="2" | Glide
| || || || ||  ||
|}

The evidence for  comes from prefixes;  has not been found in stem-initial position and thus is in parentheses above. Hale reconstructs the nasalization feature for nasal vowels. Vowel quality and prosodic features like vowel length, tone, and stress have not yet been reconstructed for the Tanoan family. Hale (1967) gives certain sets of vowel quality correspondences.

The following table illustrates the reconstructed initial consonants in Proto-Tanoan and its reflexes in the daughter languages.

{| class="wikitable" style="text-align: center; line-height: 1.1em;"
|+ style="line-height: 1.5em;" | Initial consonants in proto-language and daughter languages
! rowspan="2" | Proto-Tanoan
! rowspan="2" | Tiwa
! rowspan="2" | Tewa
! rowspan="2" | Towa
! rowspan="2" | Kiowa
| rowspan="16" |
! colspan="2" | Proto-Tanoan
! rowspan="2" | Tiwa
! rowspan="2" | Tewa
! rowspan="2" | Towa
! rowspan="2" | Kiowa
|- style="font-size: x-small;"
! consonant !! environment
|-
! 
|  ||  || ∅  || 
!  !!
|  ||  || 
| rowspan="3" | 
|-
! 
|  ||  ||  || ∅
! rowspan="2" | 
! style="font-weight: normal; font-size: x-small;" | before oral vowel
|  ||  || 
|-
! 
|  ||  ||  || 
! style="font-weight: normal; font-size: x-small;" | before nasal vowel
| rowspan="2" | 
| rowspan="2" | 
| rowspan="2" | 
|-
! 
|  ||  ||  || 
!  !!
| 
|-
! 
|  ||  ||  || 
!  !!
| rowspan="2" | 
| rowspan="2" | 
| 
| 
|-
! 
| rowspan="2" | 
| rowspan="2" | 
| rowspan="2" |  || 
!  !!
| 
| rowspan="2" | 
|-
! 
| 
!  !!
| rowspan="2" | 
| 
| rowspan="2" | 
|-
! 
|  ||  || 
| rowspan="2" | 
!  !!
| 
| rowspan="2" | 
|-
! 
|   ||  || 
!  !!
|  || 
| rowspan="2" | 
|-
! 
|  || 
| rowspan="2" | 
| rowspan="2" | 
!  !!
|  || 
| rowspan="2" | 
|-
! 
| 
| rowspan="2" | 
!  !!
|  ||  || 
|-
! 
| 
|   || 
!  !!
|  || 
| rowspan="2" | 
| rowspan="2" | 
|-
! 
|  || 
| rowspan="2" | 
| rowspan="2" | 
!  !!
|  || 
|-
! 
|   || 
| colspan="6" style="background-color: lightGrey;" |
|}

As can be seen in the above table, a number of phonological mergers have occurred in the different languages.
Cognate sets supporting the above are listed below:

{| class="wikitable" style="text-align: center;"
|+ Cognate sets demonstrating initial consonant correspondences
! !!  Tiwa  !!  Tewa  !!  Towa  !!  Kiowa  !! meaning(s)
|-
! *b
|  ||  ||  || 
| style="text-align: left;" | "to bring"
|-
! *m
|  ||  ||  || 
| style="text-align: left;" |  "hand"
|-
! *d (+ V)
|  ||  ||  || –
| style="text-align: left;" | "fowl"
|-
! *d (+ Ṽ)
|  ||  ||  || 
| style="text-align: left;" | "sand" (in Taos), "ground" (in Tewa, Kiowa), "space" (in Jemez)
|-
! *n
|  ||  ||  || 
| style="text-align: left;" | first person singular
|-
! *ts
|  ||  ||  || 
| style="text-align: left;" | "eye"
|-
! *t
|  ||  ||  || 
| style="text-align: left;" | "to say"
|-
! *tsʰ
|  ||  ||  || 
| style="text-align: left;" | "to drink"
|-
! *tʰ
|  ||  ||  || 
| style="text-align: left;" | "to break" (in Taos, Tewa, Jemez), "to sever several" (in Kiowa)
|-
! *ts’
|  || – || – || 
| style="text-align: left;" | "liver"
|-
! *t’
|  ||  ||  || 
| style="text-align: left;" | "antelope"
|-
! *dz
|  || – ||  || 
| style="text-align: left;" | "song" (in Taos, Jemez), "to sing" (in Kiowa)
|}

Notes

Bibliography 

 Campbell, Lyle. (1997). American Indian languages: The historical linguistics of Native America. New York: Oxford University Press. .
 Cordell, Linda A. (1979). Prehistory: Eastern Anasazi. In A. Ortiz (Ed.), Handbook of North American Indians: Southwest (Vol. 9, pp. 131–151). Washington, D.C.: Smithsonian Institution.
 Davis, Irvine. (1959). Linguistic cues to northern Rio Grande prehistory. El Palacio, 66 (3), 73–84.
 Davis, Irvine. (1979). The Kiowa–Tanoan, Keresan, and Zuni languages. In L. Campbell & M. Mithun (Eds.), The languages of native America: Historical and comparative assessment (pp. 390–443). Austin: University of North Texas.
 Dozier, Edward P. (1954). The Hopi-Tewa of Arizona. University of California Publications in American Archaeology and Ethnology, 44 (3), 259–376.
 Eggan, Fred. (1979). Pueblos: Introduction. In A. Ortiz (Ed.), Handbook of North American Indians: Southwest (Vol. 9, pp. 224–235). Washington, D.C.: Smithsonian Institution.
 Ellis, Florence Hawley. (1967). Where did the Pueblo people come from? El Palacio, 74 (3), 35–43.
 Ford, Richard I.; Schroeder, Albert H.; & Peckham, Stewart L. (1972). Three perspectives on Puebloan prehistory. In A. Ortiz (Ed.), New perspectives on the Pueblos (pp. 19–39). Albuquerque: University of New Mexico Press.
 Foster, Michael K. (1999). Language and the culture history of North America. In I. Goddard (Ed.), Handbook of North American Indians: Languages (Vol. 17, pp. 64–110). Washington, D.C.: Smithsonian Institution.
 Hale, Kenneth L. (1962). Jemez and Kiowa correspondences in reference to Kiowa–Tanoan. International Journal of American Linguistics, 28 (1), 1–5.
 Hale, Kenneth L. (1967). Toward a reconstruction of Kiowa–Tanoan phonology. International Journal of American Linguistics, 33 (2), 112–120.
 Hale, Kenneth L. (1979). Historical linguistics and archeology. In A. Ortiz (Ed.), Handbook of North American Indians: Southwest (Vol. 9, pp. 170–177). Washington, D.C.: Smithsonian Institution.
 Harrington, J. P. (1910). On phonetic and lexic resemblances in Kiowan and Tanoan. American Anthropologist, 12 (1), 119–123.
 Harrington, J. P. (1928). Vocabulary of the Kiowa language. Bureau of American Ethnology bulletin (No. 84). Washington, D.C.: U.S. Govt. Print. Off.
 Hill, Jane H. (2002). Toward a linguistic prehistory of the Southwest: "Azteco-Tanoan" and the arrival of maize cultivation. Journal of Anthropological Research, 58 (4), 457–476.
 Hill, Jane H. (2008). Northern Uto-Aztecan and Kiowa–Tanoan: Evidence of contact between the proto-Languages? International Journal of American Linguistics, 74 (2), 155–188.
 Kinkade, M. Dale; & Powell, J. V. (1976). Language and prehistory of North America. World Archaeology, 8 (1), 83-100.
 Leap, William L. (1971). Who were the Piro? Anthropological Linguistics, 13 (7), 321–330.
 Miller, Wick R. (1959). A note on Kiowa linguistic affiliations.  American Anthropologist, 61 (1), 102–105.
 Mithun, Marianne. (1999). The languages of Native North America. Cambridge: Cambridge University Press.  (hbk); .
 Mooney, James. (1898). Calendar history of the Kiowa Indians. In 17th annual report of the Bureau of American Ethnology for 1895-1896 (Part 1, pp. 129–445). Washington, D.C.
 Mooney, James. (1907). Kiowa. In F. W. Hodge (Ed.), Handbook of American Indians (Part 1, pp. 669–701). Bureau of American Ethnology bulletin (No. 30). Washington, D.C.
 Newman, Stanley S. (1954). American Indian linguistics in the Southwest. American Anthropologist, 56 (4), 626–634.
 Nichols, Lynn. (1994). Subordination and ablaut in Kiowa–Tanoan. Southwest Journal of Linguistics, 13, 85–99.
 Nichols, Lynn. (1996). Toward a reconstruction of Kiowa–Tanoan ablaut. In Proceedings of the 22nd annual meeting of the Berkeley Linguistics Society.
 Plog, Fred. (1979). Prehistory: Western Anasazi. In A. Ortiz (Ed.), Handbook of North American Indians: Southwest (Vol. 9, pp. 108–130). Washington, D.C.: Smithsonian Institution.
 Reed, Erik K. (1949). Sources of upper Rio Grande Pueblo culture and population. El Palacio, 56 (6), 163–184.
 Snow, Dean R. (1976). The archaeology of North America. New York: The Viking Press.
 Trager, George L. (1942). The historical phonology of the Tiwa languages. Studies in Linguistics, 1 (5), 1-10.
 Trager, George L. (1951). Linguistic history and ethnologic history in the Southwest. Journal of the Washington Academy of Science, 41, 341–343.
 Trager, George L. (1967). The Tanoan settlement of the Rio Grande area: A possible chronology. In D. H. Hymes & W. E. Bittle (Eds.), Studies in southwestern ethnolinguistics: Meaning and history in the languages of the American Southwest (pp. 335–350). The Hague: Mouton.
 Trager, George L. (1969). Taos and Picuris: How long separated. International Journal of American Linguistics, 35 (2), 180–182.
 Trager, George L.; & Trager, Edith Crowell. (1959). Kiowa and Tanoan.  American Anthropologist, 61 (6), 1078–1083.
 Wendorf, Fred. (1954). A reconstruction of northern Rio Grande prehistory. American Anthropologist, 56 (2), 200–227.
 Wendorf, Fred; & Reed, Erik K. (1955). An alternative reconstruction of northern Rio Grande prehistory. El Palacio, 62 (5/6), 131–173.

 
Language families
Pueblo linguistic area